Preis der SWR-Bestenliste is a literature prize awarded in Baden-Württemberg, Germany.

Winners 

1978 Gerhard Roth
1979 Ludwig Fels
1980 Otto F. Walter
1981 Peter Weiss
1982 Franz Fühmann
1983 Oskar Pastior
1984 Christa Reinig
1985 Friederike Mayröcker
1986 György Konrád
1987 Brigitte Kronauer
1988 Danilo Kiš
1989 Paul Wühr
1990 Thomas Hürlimann
1991 Georges-Arthur Goldschmidt
1992 Urs Widmer
1993 László Krasznahorkai
1994 Zbigniew Herbert
1995 Adolf Endler
1996 Peter Rühmkorf
1997 Markus Werner
1998 Dubravka Ugrešić
1999 Rafael Chirbes
2000 Ulrich Peltzer
2001 Katja Lange-Müller
2002 Boris Pahor
2003 Ernst-Wilhelm Händler
2004 Kathrin Röggla
2005 Lutz Seiler
2006 Agota Kristof
2007 Hans Joachim Schädlich
2008 Günter Herburger
2009 Kathrin Schmidt
2010 Patrick Modiano
2011 Aris Fioretos
2012 Péter Nádas
2013 Ulrike Edschmid
2014 Angelika Klüssendorf
2015 Esther Kinsky

References

Literary awards of Baden-Württemberg